Euniolide is a cembrene-like diterpene from the Caribbean gorgonians Eunicea succinea and Eunicea mammosa.

References 

Lactones
Epoxides
Diterpenoids
Heterocyclic compounds with 3 rings